Driver Hanumanthu is an Indian Kannada language film released in 1980, starring Shivaram and with guest appearances by Vishnuvardhan in the role of a classical singer and Ambareesh in the role of a Church father.

Soundtrack

All the songs are composed and scored by Vijaya Bhaskar. The album has four tracks.

Reception
The film failed commercially.

References

External links

1980 films
1980s Kannada-language films
Films scored by Vijaya Bhaskar
Films directed by K. S. L. Swamy